Andrew Meek (7 December 1889 – 13 February 1957) was an Australian cricketer. He played five first-class matches for Western Australia between 1920/21 and 1925/26.

See also
 List of Western Australia first-class cricketers

References

External links
 

1889 births
1957 deaths
Australian cricketers
Western Australia cricketers